Ex Hex is a 2005 Mary Timony solo album.

Ex Hex may also refer to:
 Ex Hex (band), band formed by Mary Timony